Yengidzha or Yenidzha may refer to:
Yengidzha, Armenia
Sisavan, Armenia
Yengica, Qabala, Azerbaijan
Yengicə, Azerbaijan
Yenicə, Agdash, Azerbaijan 
Yenicə, Yevlakh, Azerbaijan
Ərəbyengicə, Azerbaijan
Yengidzha, Iran